Brother Arab is the debut studio album by American hip hop recording artist Arabian Prince. It was released on November 28, 1989 through Orpheus Records with distribution via EMI USA, a division of Capitol Records. Recording sessions took place at Trax Recording Studios in Hollywood. Production was handled entirely by Tim "That Guy" Reid II and Kim "Arabian Prince" Nazel, the latter also served as executive producer. The album spawned three singles: "She's Got a Big Posse", "Situation Critical" and "Gettin' Down"/"Dope Thang". Its lead single, "She's Got a Big Posse", peaked at number 9 on the Hot Rap Songs.

The album made it to number 193 on the Billboard 200 and at number 55 on the Top R&B/Hip-Hop Albums chart in the United States.

Track listing

Personnel
Kim Nazel – main artist, vocals, scratches, producer, mixing, executive producer
Tim Reid II – scratches, producer, mixing
Disco D – scratches
Elwood "The Rock" Carrington – guitar solo (track 2)
Brian "The Punch" Carney – engineering
Chris Bellman – mastering
Henry Marquez – art direction
Mike Miller – photography

Charts

References

External links

1989 debut albums
Arabian Prince albums
Hip hop albums by American artists